Clinozoisite is a complex calcium aluminium sorosilicate mineral with formula: Ca2Al3(Si2O7)(SiO4)O(OH). It forms a continuous solid solution series with epidote by substitution of iron(III) in the aluminium (m3 site) and is also called aluminium epidote.

Clinothulite is a manganese bearing variety with a pinkish hue due to substitution of Mn(III) in the aluminium site. 

It was originally discovered in 1896 in East Tyrol, Austria, and is so-named because of its resemblance to zoisite and its monoclinic crystal structure. 

It occurs in rocks which have undergone low to medium grade regional metamorphism and in contact metamorphism of high calcium sedimentary rocks. It also occurs in saussurite alteration
of plagioclase.

Jadeite bearing pyroxene minerals have suggested Clinozoisite and paragonite are associated and derived from lawsonite releasing Quartz and water via the following reaction:

4CaAl2Si2O8(H2O)2 + NaAlSi2O6 <=> 2Ca2Al3Si3O12(OH) + NaAl3Si3O10(OH)2 + SiO2 + 6H2O

References

Nesse, William D., "Introduction to Mineralogy," (c)2000 Oxford University Press 

Sorosilicates
Epidote group
Calcium minerals
Aluminium minerals
Monoclinic minerals
Minerals in space group 11